The Jász-Nagykun-Szolnok County constituency no. 6 was one of the single member constituencies of the National Assembly, the national legislature of Hungary. The district was established in 1990, when the National Assembly was re-established with the end of the communist dictatorship. It was abolished in 2011.

Members
The constituency was first represented by Albert Tóth of the Hungarian Democratic Forum (MDF) from 1990 to 1994. István Tokár of the Hungarian Socialist Party (MSZP) was elected in 1994 and served until 1998. In 1998 Lajos Búsi of Fidesz was elected representative. Endre Rózsa of the MSZP was elected in 2002 and served until 2010. In 2010 election followed by István Boldog of Fidesz.

Election result

1990 election

References

Jasz-Nagykun-Szolnok 6th